Andrzej Sądej (born 20 December 1957) is a Polish and Canadian judoka who competed as a member of the Polish national judo team and has played a major role in the development of high-level judo in Canada. He coached the Canadian national judo team from 1990–96, has held a wide variety of administrative positions at Judo Canada including Sports Director and Executive Director since 1998, and has coached the Canadian Paralympic team since 2014.

Interviews

See also 

 Judo in Ontario
 Judo in Canada
 List of Canadian judoka

References

External links
 

Polish male judoka
Canadian male judoka
1957 births
Living people